The 2018 Super2 Series (known for commercial reasons as the 2018 Dunlop Super2 Series) was an Australian motor racing competition for Supercars, staged as a support series to the 2018 Supercars Championship. It was the nineteenth running of the Supercars Development Series, the second tier of competition in Supercars racing.

The series was won by Chris Pither, driving in a Garry Rogers Motorsport prepared Holden VF Commodore.

Teams and drivers 

The following teams and drivers competed in the series.

Team changes 
 Eggleston Motorsport expanded to a four-car team after purchasing an extra Holden VF Commodore built by Triple Eight Race Engineering.
 Grove Racing made their series début after purchasing an ex-Triple Eight VF Commodore.
 Kostecki Brothers Racing expanded their operations to become a three-car team.

Driver changes

Entering/rejoining series 
 Dean Fiore returned to full-time competition with MW Motorsport in preparation for the 2018 Enduro Cup.
 Formula 4 regular Zane Goddard made his Super2 début, replacing Andrew Jones at Brad Jones Racing.
 Tyler Greenbury, who finished runner-up in the third-tier V8 Touring Car National Series in 2017, was promoted to the Super2 Series in 2018. Greenbury raced for Matt Stone Racing.
 Brenton Grove made his series début with Grove Racing after contesting the Porsche GT3 Cup Challenge and Carrera Cup Australia in 2017.
 Chris Pither returned to the series on a full-time basis with Garry Rogers Motorsport.
 Thomas Randle returned to Australia after two years competing in Europe. Randle replaced Josh Kean at Tickford Racing.
 Alex Rullo returned to the series with MW Motorsport after entering in the Supercars series in 2017.
 Reigning Australian Endurance Championship champion Dominic Storey made his Super2 début with Eggleston Motorsport.

Changing teams 
 Shae Davies moved from MW Motorsport to Paul Morris Motorsport where he replaced Anton de Pasquale.
 Bryce Fullwood moved from MW Motorsport to Matt Stone Racing.
 2016 series champion Garry Jacobson moved from Tickford Racing to MW Motorsport.
 Brodie Kostecki left Matt Stone Racing to join his cousins Kurt and Jake Kostecki at Kostecki Brothers Racing.
 Adam Marjoram moved from Matt Stone Racing to Image Racing, replacing Jack Perkins.

Leaving series 
 Anton de Pasquale, Todd Hazelwood and Jack Le Brocq left the series as they graduated to the Supercars Championship with Erebus Motorsport, Matt Stone Racing and Tekno Autosports respectively.
 Andrew Jones, Josh Kean and Matthew Palmer left the championship.
 Richard Muscat left the series to prepare for the Enduro Cup.

Mid-season changes 
 Tyler Greenbury left the series after three rounds, citing sponsorship issues. He was replaced with Jaie Robson for Barbagallo.

Calendar
The 2018 Dunlop Super2 Series comprised seven rounds:

Calendar changes
 The Bathurst 1000 support race returned to being a points-paying series round again after the 2017 Supercheap Auto Bathurst 1000 failed to draw wildcard entries and the accompanying Super2 non-series round saw a downturn in participation from previous years.
 The category returned to Barbagallo Raceway for a series round. The round had been removed from the 2017 Super2 Series schedule to allow teams the opportunity to run wildcard entries in the Supercars Championship event, but no entries were received.
 The series no longer hosted four-race format rounds.

Rule changes

Sporting regulations 
The "wildcard" programme introduced in 2017 to allows teams from the Dunlop Super2 Series to compete in the Supercars Championship continued in 2018. Entries were open for the Winton, Hidden Valley, Ipswich and Tailem Bend rounds, while the Barbagallo round was discontinued.

Technical regulations 
The Super2 Series no longer allowed "Project Blueprint" cars after fifteen years of use in Supercars and Super2 series. They were replaced by the "New Generation" cars first introduced to Supercars racing in 2013, bringing the Super2 Series in line with the technical regulations of its parent series. The Project Blueprint cars were eligible to compete in the V8 Touring Car National Series, the third tier of the sport.

Results and standings

Season summary

Points system
Points were awarded in each race as follows.

Series standings

References

External links
 
 2018 Operations Manual, www.supercars.com, as archived at web.archive.org
 2018 Dunlop Super2 Series Points, www.supercars.com, as archived at web.archive.org

Supercars Development Series
Super2 Series